Susan E. Short is the Robert E. Turner Distinguished Professor of Population Studies at Brown University who is known for her work on how gender, family, health and well-being are effected by social and political environments.

Education 
Short received her B.A. in Human Biology from Stanford University in 1986. She earned a Master's (1994) and a Ph.D. (1997) from the University of North Carolina, Chapel Hill.

Career 
After receiving her PhD in 1997, Short began in her role as assistant professor at Brown University. Short served as a visiting scholar at the National University of Lesotho from 2003 to 2004 studying the AIDS epidemic in Sub-Saharan Africa. Additionally, she was a visiting scientist at Harvard School of Public Health from 2008 to 2010. From 2011 to 2014, Short was Director of Graduate Studies for the Sociology Department at Brown University. In 2022, she was named the Robert E. Turner Distinguished Professor of Population Studies at Brown University.

Research 
Short's research highlights changing social and political environments and their implications for family dynamics, gender, health, and well-being. Her research examines a variety of issues, including, economic reform and the one child policy in China, the HIV/AIDS pandemic in Lesotho, and changes in the organization of women's work and parenting in the United States.

Selected publications

Awards and honors 
In 2016, Short was elected to the Sociological Research Association. Short was elected a fellow of the American Association for the Advancement of Science in 2020.

References 

Living people
Brown University faculty
Fellows of the American Association for the Advancement of Science
University of North Carolina at Chapel Hill alumni
Stanford University alumni
American women sociologists
Year of birth missing (living people)